Ravisloe Country Club is a public golf course and wedding venue located in Homewood, Illinois.

History
The original golf course, designed by James Foulis and Theodore Moreau in 1901, as a 9-hole course. An additional 55 acres were purchased and 9 more holes were designed and overseen by William Watson from 1910 to 1913. Donald Ross supervised a renovation, carried out from over the span of years 1917–19. Updates continued until 1924. In 2001 club membership commissioned David Esler to restore the course features in the same style as Donald Ross.  The club was listed on the National Register of Historic Places in 2021.

The country club was established in 1901 by mostly Jewish members of Chicago’s Standard Club, on the site of the Briggs farm, only after the first property choice belonging to a Dutchman named Ravisloot. The membership decided on Ravislow, eventually settling on the name Ravisloe.

In 1902, the Spanish Mission styled clubhouse was designed by George Nimmons, the same architect behind Olympia Fields’ clubhouse. In 2008 the club was sold to Dr. Claude Gendreau, a veterinary surgeon.

Elaine Rosenthal
One of the early pioneers in women's golf was Elaine Rosenthal, who played at Ravisloe.
She has a trophy named after her, which is presented to winners of the Illinois Women's Open.
She was inducted to the Illinois Golf Hall Of Fame in 1995.

References

External links

Ravisloeweddings.com
@ravisloeweddings
@ravisloecountryclub

Golf clubs and courses in Illinois
Golf clubs and courses designed by Donald Ross
1901 establishments in Illinois
National Register of Historic Places in Cook County, Illinois